The Spindle of Life is a 1917 American silent comedy film directed by George Cochrane and starring Ben F. Wilson, Neva Gerber and Jessie Pratt.

Cast
 Ben F. Wilson as 'Alphabet' Carter
 Neva Gerber as Gladsome
 Jessie Pratt as Mrs. Harrison
 Ed Brady as Jason
 Dick La Reno as Hooky 
 Winter Hall as James Bradshaw
 Hayward Mack as Vincent Bradshaw

References

Bibliography
 Goble, Alan. The Complete Index to Literary Sources in Film. Walter de Gruyter, 1999.

External links
 

1917 films
1917 comedy films
1910s English-language films
American silent feature films
Silent American comedy films
American black-and-white films
Universal Pictures films
1910s American films